Euclidean (or, less commonly, Euclidian) is an adjective derived from the name of Euclid, an ancient Greek mathematician. It is the name of:

Geometry 
Euclidean space, the two-dimensional plane and three-dimensional space of Euclidean geometry as well as their higher dimensional generalizations
Euclidean geometry, the study of the properties of Euclidean spaces
Non-Euclidean geometry, systems of points, lines, and planes analogous to Euclidean geometry but without uniquely determined parallel lines
Euclidean distance, the distance between pairs of points in Euclidean spaces
Euclidean ball, the set of points within some fixed distance from a center point

Number theory 
Euclidean division, the division which produces a quotient and a remainder
Euclidean algorithm, a method for finding greatest common divisors
Extended Euclidean algorithm, a method for solving the Diophantine equation ax + by = d where d is the greatest common divisor of a and b
Euclid's lemma: if a prime number divides a product of two numbers, then it divides at least one of those two numbers
Euclidean domain, a ring in which Euclidean division may be defined, which allows Euclid's lemma to be true and the Euclidean algorithm and the extended Euclidean algorithm to work

Other 
Euclidean relation, a property of binary relations related to transitivity
Euclidean distance map, a digital image in which each pixel value represents the Euclidean distance to an obstacle
Euclidean zoning, a system of land use management modeled after the zoning code of Euclid, Ohio
Euclidean division of the Intermediate Math League of Eastern Massachusetts

See also 
Euclid (disambiguation)
Euclid's Elements, a 13-book mathematical treatise written by Euclid, that includes both geometry and number theory
Euclideon, an Australian computer graphics company

Mathematics disambiguation pages